Number Seventeen was a Manhattan-based graphic design studio formed by Emily Oberman and Bonnie Siegler, in operation from 1993 to 2012. The studio specialized in graphics for print, film, and television media. Their clients included Saturday Night Live, Jane Magazine (among many others). They were also responsible for creating the iconic Will and Grace opening titles.

Before forming Number Seventeen, Oberman worked with Tibor Kalman at M&Co. Siegler was a design director at VH1.

Number Seventeen was featured in Eye magazine (No. 39, Vol. 10, Spring 2001) in an article by Steven Heller. In that article Siegler is quoted:

External links
 No. 17 website

References

Graphic design studios